Drammen Kommunale Trikk (DKT) (lit: Drammen Municipal Tram) was a Norwegian company that operated the Drammen trolleybus and bus system between July 1, 1947 and 1981, though the trolleybus system was closed in 1967. The company was started by the Drammen City Council when the licence of the former operator of the trolleybuses, A/S Trikken, went out of date. The company operated both the trolleybuses and diesel buses of Drammen until 1981, when the company was merged to create a common operating company for Drammen, Lier and Nedre Eiker. The new company was named Drammen og Omegn Busslinjer, and was sold to Nettbuss in 1999.

References

Defunct bus companies of Norway
Trolleybus transport in Norway
Companies formerly owned by municipalities of Norway
Transport companies established in 1947
Transport companies disestablished in 1981
Norwegian companies established in 1947
1981 disestablishments in Norway
Companies based in Drammen
1981 mergers and acquisitions